Hoshihananomia octopunctata is a species of tumbling flower beetle in the family Mordellidae. It is found in North America.

References

Further reading

External links

 

Beetles described in 1775
Mordellidae
Taxa named by Johan Christian Fabricius